The Penchala Tunnel is a highway tunnel in Kuala Lumpur, Malaysia. It is the widest highway tunnel in the country. This 700-metre tunnel, located on the Sprint Expressway's Penchala Link, connects Sungai Penchala to Mont Kiara. Unlike other highway tunnels in Malaysia which used tunnel boring machines during construction, the Penchala Tunnel was bored by using the slower rock-explosion method, due to unstable rock condition (limestones) at the tunnel site which prevented the concessionaire company Sistem Penyuraian Trafik KL Barat Sdn Bhd (Sprint) to use the faster tunnel boring machine method.

Road tunnels in Malaysia